Reginald Benade (also known as Johannes) is a Paralympian athlete from Namibia competing mainly in category F35/36 throwing events.

He competed in the 2008 Summer Paralympics in Beijing, China. There he won a bronze medal in the men's F35/36 discus throw event.

In February 2015, Benade was reportedly attacked with a pair of pliers during an altercation at a metro station in Taipei, Taiwan and sustained head injuries. Chiu Kuang-hsun was subsequently arrested on suspicion of attempted murder.

References

External links
 

Paralympic athletes of Namibia
Athletes (track and field) at the 2008 Summer Paralympics
Paralympic bronze medalists for Namibia
Living people
Year of birth missing (living people)
Medalists at the 2008 Summer Paralympics
Paralympic medalists in athletics (track and field)
Namibian discus throwers